La Haye was a farm, in a hamlet of the same name, in the Belgian municipality of Lasne. It was destroyed by fire in 1910. During the Battle of Waterloo (18 June 1815) the farm was one of the fortified garrisoned points that made up a bulwark on the extreme left (eastern end) of the Duke of Wellington's Anglo-allied line.

History
About  to the east was the hamlet of Smohain. At this point the valley had become a defile with a boggy stream at the bottom.

The  bulwark was held during the day by Anglo-allied soldiers under the command of Prince Bernhard of Saxe-Weimar. At about 19:30 the vanguard of Prussian I Corps (Zieten's) linked up with the Anglo-allied army in this area.

See also
 List of Waterloo Battlefield locations

Notes

References

Waterloo Battlefield locations
Buildings and structures in Walloon Brabant
Lasne